Bonfanti is an Italian surname. Notable people with the surname include:

Antonio Bonfanti, Italian painter
Aquilino Bonfanti, Italian footballer
Arnaldo Bonfanti, Italian footballer
Arturo Bonfanti (1905-1978), Italian painter
Christian Bonfanti, Italian road cycler
Elena Maria Bonfanti, Italian female sprinter
Marcus Bonfanti, British blues singer, songwriter and guitarist
Marie Bonfanti (1845-1921), Italian and American ballet dancer and teacher 
Nicholas Bonfanti (born 2002), Italian footballer

Italian-language surnames